Sound an Alarm is a 1962 documentary about the role of the Royal Observer Corps during the event of a nuclear attack on the United Kingdom. The film identified as "Sound an Alarm" is also known as "The Hole in the Ground." It is mistakenly identified because in some versions the title frame is missing, and the name is taken from the final credits which is the motto of the United Kingdom Warning and Monitoring Organisation.

See also
 List of films about nuclear issues

References

External links
 
 Full movie

Cold War documents
Social guidance films
Documentary films about nuclear war and weapons
Emergency management in the United Kingdom
Public information films
Cold War history of the United Kingdom
1962 films
British documentary films
1960s educational films
1962 documentary films
1960s British films
British educational films